Sigrid Persoon (born 12 March 1983) is a Belgian former gymnast. She competed at the 2000 Summer Olympics.

References

External links
 

1983 births
Living people
Belgian female artistic gymnasts
Olympic gymnasts of Belgium
Gymnasts at the 2000 Summer Olympics
People from Dendermonde
Sportspeople from East Flanders